Victor Sintès (born 8 August 1980 in Caen, Normandy, France) is a former French fencer who now represents Algeria internationally. At the 2012 Summer Olympics he competed for France in the Men's foil, but was defeated in the third round.

At the 2016 Summer Olympics, Victor represented Algeria in Men's foil. He was defeated in the first round 4-15.

References

French male foil fencers
Algerian male foil fencers
1980 births
Living people
Olympic fencers of France
Fencers at the 2012 Summer Olympics
Fencers at the 2016 Summer Olympics
Olympic fencers of Algeria
Sportspeople from Caen
French sportspeople of Algerian descent